Julia Cohen (born March 23, 1989) is an American former professional tennis player. In 2001, she won the USTA National Spring Championships 12-Under Division Championship. In her career, Cohen won five singles and four doubles titles on the ITF Women's World Tennis Tour. On July 30, 2012, she reached her best singles ranking of world No. 97. On May 13, 2013, she peaked at No. 121 in the doubles rankings. 

She played collegiate tennis for the Miami Hurricanes at the University of Miami in Coral Gables, Florida.

Tennis career
Cohen grew up in Philadelphia and started tennis at the age of three. Her father, Dr. Richard Cohen, played tennis for the University of Pennsylvania and played professional tennis for two years, and her brother Josh was an All-American tennis player at the University of Miami and became head coach of the World Team Tennis Philadelphia Freedoms. At the age of six she was ranked No. 1 in 18-and-under doubles in the USTA Middle States region (including Pennsylvania, New Jersey and Delaware). In 1997, at the age of eight, she became the youngest player to win an adult match in a Middle States Tennis Association tournament. She was then the US champion in the 9-and-under division.

In 2001, she won the USTA National Spring Championships 12-Under Division Championship. In 2006, she was the top-ranked American girl tennis player. That same year, she and partner Kimberly Couts reached the quarterfinals in doubles at the Wimbledon Junior Championships.

When she was 15 years old, she was No. 6 in the ITF junior world rankings. On June 11, 2007, she was ranked No. 4 in the junior rankings.

Collegiate tennis career
In her first year of college tennis, playing number 1 singles for the University of Florida Gators. She was SEC Rookie of the Year and Intercollegiate Tennis Association (ITA) Rookie of the Year.  She transferred to the University of Miami and finished the year ranked fifth in the U.S. in singles, and was named All-ACC.

Cohen earned her bachelor's degree in sports administration summa cum laude from California University of Pennsylvania in 2012 and a master's degree in sport psychology in 2013.

Professional career
She is coached by her brother's friend Conor Taylor. She won four career singles and five doubles titles on the ITF Women's Circuit. Cohen played in the 2012 Baku Cup. She made it to her first and only WTA Tour final there, before losing in straight sets to fifth-seeded Serbian Bojana Jovanovski. That year she reached No. 121 in the WTA doubles rankings, and No. 97 in the WTA singles rankings.

She played in World TeamTennis for the Philadelphia Freedoms and the Boston Lobsters.

Coaching career
As an assistant coach, Cohen joined the Chestnut Hill College men's and women's tennis coaching staffs prior to the spring 2017 season.

WTA career finals

Singles: 1 (runner-up)

ITF finals

Singles: 15 (5–10)

Doubles: 10 (5–5)

See also
 List of select Jewish tennis players

References

External links
 
 

1989 births
Living people
Tennis players from Philadelphia
American female tennis players
Florida Gators women's tennis players
Jewish American sportspeople
Jewish tennis players
Miami Hurricanes women's tennis players
21st-century American Jews
21st-century American women